The South Dakota Intercollegiate Conference (SDIC) was an NAIA-associated collegiate athletic conference that ceased operations following the 1999–2000 academic school year when it merged with the North Dakota College Athletic Conference to form the Dakota Athletic Conference. The SDIAC was formed in 1917 from twelve schools, though membership was down to five during World War II, as the religious schools formed the South Dakota College Conference (later Dakota-Iowa Conference). Those schools joined back in by 1948. From 1995 to 2000 seasons, the league was known as the South Dakota-Iowa Intercollegiate Conference, thanks to the addition of Dordt and Westmar colleges in Iowa. Westmar closed in 1997. The SDIIC split in 2000, with half of the schools heading to the DAC (Black Hills State, Dakota State, Si-Tanka Huron, and South Dakota Mines), while the other half joined the Great Plains Athletic Conference (Dakota Wesleyan, Dordt, Mount Marty, and Sioux Falls).

The following is a list of historic members:

(*) Augustana, Dakota Wesleyan, Huron, Sioux Falls, and Yankton played in the SDCC/SDIC from 1940 to 1948. Sioux Falls and Yankton also left in 1960 to play in the Tri-State Conference. Sioux Falls returned in 1977 and Yankton returned in 1981.

Membership timeline 

(*) Institution closed at this time

References

 
Sports organizations established in 1917
1917 establishments in South Dakota
2000 disestablishments in South Dakota